Al-Nujaba TV is an Iraqi satellite television channel based in Baghdad, Iraq, which was launched in 2013.

The channel is owned and controlled by Harakat Hezbollah al-Nujaba, an Iraqi Shi'ite paramilitary group, which in February 2019 was designated by the United States a Specially Designated Global Terrorist (SDGT), as was its leader Akram al-Kaabi and Al-Nujaba TV.

See also

Television in Iraq

References

External links
 

Television stations in Iraq
Arab mass media
Arabic-language television stations
Television channels and stations established in 2013
Arab Spring and the media
Popular Mobilization Forces